Milan Gajić (born 28 January 1996) is a Serbian professional footballer who plays as a right-back for Russian club CSKA Moscow.

Club career

Early career
Born in the eastern Slavonian city of Vukovar, Croatia, Gajić spent his childhood in the northern Serbian city of Pančevo. He began practicing football at the age of six with Dinamo Pančevo. He was subsequently recruited by OFK Beograd, making his senior debut in the 2013–14 campaign. Afterwards, Gajić was a first team regular for two seasons, collecting 46 league appearances and scoring four goals.

Bordeaux
On 22 July 2015, Gajić signed a five-year contract with French club Bordeaux. His transfer from OFK Beograd reportedly cost Bordeaux €800,000. Initially, Gajić saw little playing time as he was the team's second choice to starting right back Youssouf Sabaly.

Red Star Belgrade
On 4 February 2019, Gajić signed a 3.5-year contract with Red Star Belgrade. Although Red Star qualified for the 2019–20 UEFA Champions League, coach Vladan Milojević and Red Star's management opted not to register Gajić in their 23-man Champions League squad, ultimately choosing Marko Gobeljić as the starting right-back.

CSKA Moscow
On 17 June 2022, Gajić signed a three-year contract with Russian Premier League club CSKA Moscow.

International career
Gajić represented Serbia at the 2014 UEFA Under-19 Championship, as the team was eliminated in the semi-final by Portugal. He was also a member of the team that won the 2015 FIFA U-20 World Cup.

He made his debut for Serbia national football team on 24 March 2021 in a World Cup qualifier against Ireland.

Career statistics

Club

International

Honours

Club
Red Star Belgrade
 Serbian SuperLiga (4): 2018–19, 2019–20, 2020–21, 2021–22
 Serbian Cup (2): 2020–21, 2021–22

International
Serbia
 FIFA U-20 World Cup: 2015

References

External links
 
 
 

1996 births
Living people
Sportspeople from Vukovar
Serbs of Croatia
Association football fullbacks
Serbian footballers
Serbia youth international footballers
Serbia under-21 international footballers
Serbia international footballers
OFK Beograd players
FC Girondins de Bordeaux players
Red Star Belgrade footballers
PFC CSKA Moscow players
Serbian SuperLiga players
Ligue 1 players
Russian Premier League players
Serbian expatriate footballers
Serbian expatriate sportspeople in France
Expatriate footballers in France
Serbian expatriate sportspeople in Russia
Expatriate footballers in Russia